Eubie! Is a revue featuring the music of jazz/swing composer Eubie Blake, with lyrics by Noble Sissle, Andy Razaf, Johnny Brandon, F. E. Miller, and Jim Europe. As with most revues, the show features no book, but instead showcases 23 of Eubie Blake's best songs. The idea of the show was conceived by Julianne Boyd. It opened in 1978, receiving positive reviews from Time, Newsweek, Variety, Backstage, and The Today Show.

Production
After seven previews, the Broadway production, opened on September 20, 1978, at the Ambassador Theatre, where it ran for 439 performances. The show was conceived and directed by Julianne Boyd, choreographed by Billy Wilson and Henry LeTang, and costumed by Bernard Johnston. Vicki Carter was the musical director, pianist, and conductor. Lou Gonzalez was the sound designer. Eubie Blake was nearly 100 years of age when the show opened.  An original cast recording was produced by Warner Brothers and released on vinyl in 1979, and was later released on CD.

The theater setting was designed to be reminiscent of the 1920s, with "curlicued settings, dancers diving down a staircase in a pie-shaped wedge, a girl in a mantilla with a Spanish rose in her teeth". Many of the songs were from the Blake-Sissle 1921 show Shuffle Along, which follows the story of two friends who are both running for mayor. Among the songs were "Charleston Rag", "Daddy", "My Handyman Ain't Handy No More", "Gee, I Wish I Had Someone to Rock Me in the Cradle of Love", and "There's a Million Little Cupids in the Sky" (from the 1924 Blake-Sissle show The Chocolate Dandies).

A few months after the show's opening on Broadway, the tour of Eubie! opened on February 7, 1979, in Baltimore.

Songs

Act I

1.   "Good Night, Angeline" (1917), Europe and Sissle; Shuffle Along

2.   "Charleston Rag" (1899)

3.   "Shuffle Along" (1921), Sissle; Shuffle Along

4.   "In Honeysuckle Time" (1921), Sissle; Shuffle Along

5.   "I'm Just Wild About Harry" (1921), Sissle; Shuffle Along

6.   "Baltimore Buzz" (1921), Sissle; Shuffle Along

7.   "Daddy" (1921), Sissle; Shuffle Along

8.   "There's a Million Little Cupids in the Sky" (1924), Sissle; The Chocolate Dandies

9.   "I'm a Great Big Baby" (1940), Razaf; Tan Manhattan

10.  "My Handy Man Ain't Handy No More" (1930), Razaf; Blackbirds of 1930

11.  "Low Down Blues" (1921), Sissle; Shuffle Along

12.  "Gee, I Wish I Had Someone to Rock Me in the Cradle of Love" (1919), Sissle

13.  "I'm Just Simply Full of Jazz" (1919), Sissle; Shuffle Along

Act II

14.  "High Steppin' Days" (1921)

15.  "Dixie Moon" (1924), Sissle; The Chocolate Dandies

16.  "Weary" (1940), Razaf; Tan Manhattan

17.  "Roll, Jordan" (1930), Razaf

18.  "Memories of You" (1930), Razaf; Blackbirds of 1930

19.  "If You've Never Been Vamped by a Brownskin, You've Never Been Vamped at All" (1921), Sissle; Shuffle Along

20.  "You Got to Git the Gittin While the Gittin's Good" (1956), Miller

21.  "Oriental Blues" (1921), Sissle; Shuffle Along

22.  "I'm Craving for That Kind of Love" (1921) Sissle; Shuffle Along

23.  "Hot Feet" (1958), Sissle

24.  "Good Night, Angeline" (1917), Europe and Sissle; Shuffle Along

Cast 
The original cast of Eubie! included an all-black cast consisting of 12 performers and nine musicians. The performers were Ethel Beatty, Terry Burrell, Leslie Dockery, Lynnie Godfrey, Gregory Hines, Maurice Hines, Mel Johnson Jr., Lonnie McNeil, Janet Powell, Marion Ramsey, Alaina Reed, Jeffery V. Thompson. Of these performers Gregory Hines and Lynnie Godfrey were nominated for awards for their performances in Eubie!

Awards and nominations

Original Broadway production

References

External links

Eubie! at the Music Theatre International website

1978 musicals
Broadway musicals
Revues